Andrew George Schopler (born 1971) is an American lawyer who serves as a United States district judge of the United States District Court for the Southern District of California. He served as a United States magistrate judge of the same court from 2016 to 2023.

Education 

Schopler received a Bachelor of Arts, summa cum laude, from Dartmouth College in 1994 and he received a Juris Doctor from Harvard Law School in 1997.

Career 

Schopler was a  solo practitioner in Chapel Hill, North Carolina, from 1997 to 1998. In 1998, Schopler became an assistant public defender for  district 15B in North Carolina. He returned to private practice that same year. Schopler was named to the North Carolina Capital Roster for capital murder cases. From 1998 to 2004, he worked at Rudolf and Maher in Chapel Hill, North Carolina. From 2004 to 2016, he was an assistant United States attorney in the United States Attorney's Office for the Southern District of California. In the spring 2016 semester, he was a regular guest lecturer for the white-collar crime course at the University of San Diego School of Law.

He has served in the United States Army Reserve and California Army National Guard since 2014.

Federal judicial service 

Schopler served as United States magistrate judge of the Southern District of California from September 30, 2016 to March 10, 2023.

On July 14, 2022, President Joe Biden nominated Schopler to serve as a United States district judge of the same court. His nomination received the support of Senators Alex Padilla and Dianne Feinstein. President Biden nominated Schopler to the seat vacated by Judge Larry Alan Burns, who assumed senior status on January 22, 2021. On December 13, 2022, a hearing on his nomination was held before the Senate Judiciary Committee. On January 3, 2023, his nomination was returned to the president under Rule XXXI, Paragraph 6 of the United States Senate. He was renominated on January 23, 2023. On February 9, 2023, his nomination was reported out of committee by a 15–6 vote. On March 7, 2023, the Senate invoked cloture on his nomination by a 57–39 vote. His nomination was confirmed later that day by a 56–39 vote. He received his judicial commission on March 10, 2023.

References

External links 

1971 births
Living people
20th-century American lawyers
21st-century American judges
21st-century American lawyers
Assistant United States Attorneys
California lawyers
Dartmouth College alumni
Harvard Law School alumni
Judges of the United States District Court for the Southern District of California
People from Chapel Hill, North Carolina
Public defenders
United States Army reservists
United States district court judges appointed by Joe Biden
United States magistrate judges